Raffy Shart is a French-Armenian theater director and writer, film director and screenwriter, and composer / songwriter. In addition, Raffy Shart is an organizer of shows, does advertising campaigns, directs ads and music videos, writes musical scores for films, and is a songwriter for various artists and has a number of children's songs.

Raffy Shart, of Armenian origin, was known as writer of the French stage play Ma femme s'appelle Maurice with  Philippe Chevallier et Régis Laspalès.in 1997. The play was shown in more than 44 countries. He gained further fame through co-writing Quasimodo d'El Paris, directed in 1999 by Patrick Timsit as a comedic adaptation of the novel The Hunchback of Notre Dame by Victor Hugo.

In 2006, Raffy Shart  directed himself Incontrôlable with Michaël Youn, Thierry Lhermitte, Patrick Timsit et Hélène de Fougerolles and is directing the play Attache-moi au radiateur.

Filmography

Directing
2006: Incontrôlable

Screenwriter
1992: Armen and Bullik (TV movie)
1999: Quasimodo d'El Paris
2002: Ma femme s'appelle Maurice (English title: My Wife's Name Is Maurice)
2006: Incontrôlable

Actor
1999: Quasimodo d'El Paris as Man with a Hat
2002: Quelqu'un de bien as a flower shop owner

External links

French theatre directors
French male screenwriters
French screenwriters
French songwriters
Male songwriters
French people of Armenian descent
Living people
Year of birth missing (living people)